The Reverend George Whitefield is a monumental statue which once stood on the campus of the University of Pennsylvania in Philadelphia, Pennsylvania, United States. Dedicated in 1919, it was designed by sculptor R. Tait McKenzie and honors its namesake George Whitefield, Anglican cleric who was a founder of Methodism. In 2020, in reaction to the George Floyd protests, the university administration removed the statue due to Whitefield's defense of slavery.

Design 
Whitefield is standing, with a Bible in his left hand and his right hand raised. For his depiction of Whitefield, McKenzie chose to show him as a young man. The upper and middle parts of the pedestal were hexagonal and increased in diameter from top to bottom, while the bottom part was round with flat faces on the front and back. The upper base bears inscriptions on both its front and back, with the front reading "The Reverend/George/Whitefield/Bachelor of Arts/1736/Pembroke College/Oxford" and the back reading "Humble Dis-/ciple/of Jesus Christ/Eloquent/Preacher of the/Gospel". The monument bore the inscription "The University of Pennsylvania held its first session in a building erected for his congregation and was aided by his collections, guided by his counsel and inspired by his life." It is located near the Quadrangle Dormitories.

History

Dedication 
George Whitefield was an evangelist active in the Methodist movement of the mid-1700s. During a trip to the Thirteen Colonies between 1739 and 1741, he preached in Philadelphia in a small building that had been built for that purpose. Following Whitefield's sermons, the building would be used by Benjamin Franklin as the location for a new institution of higher learning, which would eventually become the University of Pennsylvania. Around 1914, the bicentenary of Whitefield's birth, there was a push to erect a statue in his honor. The previous year, during a meeting in New York City, Methodist members of the university's alumni association discussed the possibility of erecting a statue of Whitefield, and the following year the provost of the University of Pennsylvania gave a speech in his honor that contributed to the movement. In 1914, R. Tait McKenzie, a sculptor and the university's director of physical education, was commissioned for the project, and he began working on a design for the statue by 1917. The statue would be one of several that McKenzie would make for the university, including a statue of Edgar Fahs Smith and one of Franklin. In researching Whitefield, McKenzie sought out as many portraits as he could find of the man, traveling to Boston and London in the process. By 1918, the casting for the statue was completed, and a dedication was set for the university's Alumni Day, June 15, 1919. At the unveiling, Wallace MacMullen, D.D. gave a speech that chronicled Whitefield's life and his contributions to evangelism, while a choir played the hymn "For Famous Men", which included verses that honored Whitefield. The monument as a whole was a gift to the university from the Methodist Alumni Committee.

In 1992, the statue was surveyed as part of the Save Outdoor Sculpture! project.

Removal 

On July 2, 2020, the university administration announced that the statue of Whitefield would be removed. In the statement issued by University President Amy Gutmann, Provost Wendell Pritchett, and Vice President Craig Carnaroli, they highlighted Whitefield's support of slavery and his successful push to legalize slavery in the Province of Georgia. Concerning the statue, they stated that "[h]onoring him with a statue on our campus is inconsistent with our University’s core values" and that "there is absolutely no justification for having a statue honoring him at Penn". The statement also noted that several other people involved in the creation and conduct of the university had owned slaves, including Franklin, but that, unlike Whitefield, Franklin later changed his opinions on slavery and became an abolitionist. In the same announcement, the university declared the creation of the  Campus Iconography Group, which would study other pieces of university iconography and report to the university administration. The move came after the murder of George Floyd amidst the subsequent George Floyd protests, which contributed to a nationwide racial reckoning in the United States. Around this time, Princeton University, another Ivy League university, had announced that they would be renaming a building that had been named after U.S. President Woodrow Wilson due to his racist views, while in Philadelphia, a statue of Frank Rizzo near Philadelphia City Hall was removed due to his racist actions. About a month before this, on June 19, The Daily Pennsylvanian (the university's student newspaper) had published an opinion piece that called for the statue to be removed. Less than a year before this, the same author had opined that the statue should remain, but with additional markers that contextualized the statue.

Notes

References

Sources

External links 
 

1919 establishments in Pennsylvania
1919 sculptures
Bronze sculptures in Pennsylvania
Monuments and memorials in Philadelphia
Monuments and memorials removed during the George Floyd protests
Outdoor sculptures in Philadelphia
Sculptures of men in Pennsylvania
Statues in Pennsylvania
University of Pennsylvania campus
Statues removed in 2020